Dorycera inornata is a species of picture-winged fly in the genus Dorycera of the family Ulidiidae found on 
Corsica.

References

inornata
Insects described in 1864
Diptera of Europe